The Embassy of Ghana in Washington, D.C. is the diplomatic mission of the Republic of Ghana to the United States. It is located at 3512 International Drive, Northwest, Washington, D.C., in the Cleveland Park neighborhood.

The embassy also operates a Consulate General in New York City

List of Ambassadors

See also
Ghana–United States relations

References

External links

Official website
wikimapia

Ghana
Washington, D.C.
Ghana–United States relations
North Cleveland Park